Whitecross Green and Oriel Woods is a  biological Site of Special Scientific Interest between Oxford and Bicester in Oxfordshire. It is owned and managed by the Berkshire, Buckinghamshire and Oxfordshire Wildlife Trust under the name Whitecross Green Wood.

These ancient woods are part of two former royal forests, Shotover and Bernwood. They are crossed by herb-rich and grassy rides, some of which are bordered by ditches, and there is also a pond and a marsh. Twenty-four species of butterfly have been recorded including the nationally rare black hairstreak.

References

 

Berkshire, Buckinghamshire and Oxfordshire Wildlife Trust
Sites of Special Scientific Interest in Oxfordshire